Las fronteras del amor is a 1934 American Spanish language romance film directed by Frank Strayer, which stars José Mojica, Rosita Moreno, and Rafael Corio. The screenplay was written by Winifred Dunn and Miguel de Zárraga, from a screenplay by Bernice Mason.

Cast list
 José Mojica as Miguel Segovia
 Rosita Moreno as Alice Harrison
 Rafael Corio as Gastón Garnier
 Juan Martínez Plá as Tío Fred
 Alma Real as Señora Harrison
 Rudolf Amendt as Otto Van Ritter
 Chito Alonso as José López
 Gloria de la Vega as María
 Lola Montero as Fermina
 Jesús Macías as Pedro

References

External links
 
 
 

1930s romance films
American romance films
Fox Film films
Films directed by Frank R. Strayer
American black-and-white films
Films scored by Samuel Kaylin
Spanish-language American films
1930s American films